CSCL Asia is a container ship owned by Arisa Navigation Co Ltd, and sails under a Hong Kong flag. It was the largest container ship in the world when it was built.  It is one of five vessels that will be deployed from Asia to the West Coast of the U.S. On July 13, 2004, CSCL Asia made its voyage from the Hong Kong International Terminals in Kwai Chang.

Hull and engine
It is a fully cellular container ship, that has a capacity of 8,500 TEU, with 19 hatches, 9 holds, and 700 reefer plugs.

CSCL Asia has a B&W 12K98MC-C, 2-stroke, 12-cylinder engine, capable of producing , driving a fixed pitch propeller. The ship's engine was built by Doosan Engine. The ship also has an auxiliary generator, that is a 4 × 2, 2,700 kW 6,600V 60 Hz. The ship also has onboard boilers.

References

External links
 China Shipping North America 

Container ships
2004 ships
Ships of COSCO Shipping